Father and son Petřikov are famous judokas from Czech Republic (Czechoslovakia).

 Pavel Petřikov (Czech judoka born 1959)
 Pavel Petřikov (Czech judoka born 1986)